Shoaybiyeh-ye Gharbi Rural District is a rural district (dehestan) in Shadravan District, Shushtar County, Khuzestan Province, Iran. At the 2006 census, its population was 13,254, in 2,454 families.  The rural district has 36 villages.

References 

Rural Districts of Khuzestan Province
Shushtar County